Matthew Villis (born 13 April 1984) is an English footballer who played for Taunton Town as a centre back, having previously played for Bridgwater Town, Plymouth Argyle, Torquay United, Weston-Super-Mare, Tiverton Town, Bideford and Yate Town

Career
Villis began his career as a junior with Bridgwater Town before signing as a trainee with Plymouth Argyle, turning professional in July 2003.

He then joined Torquay United on a season-long loan deal in July 2004, making his league debut as an early substitute for Lee Canoville in a 4–2 defeat at home to Sheffield Wednesday. He went on to play 22 times that season as Torquay unsuccessfully battled against relegation from Division Two.

He was released by Plymouth at the end of the season and joined Torquay on a free transfer in June 2005. Despite beginning the season as a regular squad member, he lost his place after Torquay's FA Cup draw against non-league Harrogate Town and was linked with a move to ambitious non-league side Truro City. He returned to the Torquay side in February 2006 as the Gulls battled against a second successive relegation and was a regular until the end of the season under first John Cornforth and then Ian Atkins.

He was confined to the substitute's bench for the early part of the 2006-07 season, although was restored to the first team under new manager Lubos Kubik before missing the remainder of the season due to injury. He was released in May 2007 after Torquay's relegation to the Conference National. He joined Bridgwater Town on trial in early July 2007 and was again linked with Truro City before joining Southern League side Tiverton Town later the same month.

In the summer of 2010, Villis signed for Conference South side Weston-super-Mare. As of April 2012, Villis had scored three goals in 103 appearances for the Seagulls.

In the summer of 2013, Villis rejoined Tiverton Town.

In the autumn of 2016, Villis Scored in a 2–2 draw for Taunton Town against Conference side Barrow A.F.C in the Emirates FA cup first round tie

In July 2018, Villis was appointed as First Team Coach at Taunton Town.

Statistics

References

External links

1984 births
Living people
People from Bridgwater
English footballers
Association football defenders
Bridgwater Town F.C. players
Plymouth Argyle F.C. players
Torquay United F.C. players
Tiverton Town F.C. players
Weston-super-Mare A.F.C. players
Bideford A.F.C. players
Yate Town F.C. players
English Football League players
Southern Football League players
National League (English football) players